Emanuel Dantas Borges (born 1 December 1987) is a Brazilian rower.

He won a medal at the 2019 World Rowing Championships.

References

External links

1987 births
Living people
Brazilian male rowers
World Rowing Championships medalists for Brazil
21st-century Brazilian people